Wendell Roche (born August 22, 1970) is a Curaçaoan heavyweight kickboxer.

Career
Roche was born in Curaçao.

On October 16, 2010, he took part in the first round of the Ultimate Glory 2010/11 World Series at Ultimate Glory 12 where defeated Croatian veteran Stefan Leko via technical knockout as Leko retired in the second round. In the semi-finals at Ultimate Glory 13, he faced Turkish fan-favorite Gökhan Saki and was defeated by unanimous decision.

In late 2012, he competed on the third season of the Enfusion reality television show but was eliminated by Franci Grajš after defeating Jake Bostwick.

He joined Shogun gym in Beirut, Lebanon as a 1st tier trainer for the Lebanese national team.

He lost to Jasmin Bečirović by unanimous decision at Enfusion 3: Trial of the Gladiators on December 2, 2012 in Ljubljana, Slovenia.

He beat Moises Ruibal by split decision at Enfusion Live 7 in Tenerife, Spain on July 13, 2013 to win the promotion's -90 kg title.

Roche lost his Enfusion title to Andrew Tate when he was stopped in round two at Enfusion 19 in London, England on June 29, 2014.

Titles
 2013 Enfusion Live World Champion -90 kg
 SUPERKOMBAT World Grand Prix IV 2011 runner-up

Kickboxing record

|-  style="background:#fbb"
| 2019-07-21 || Loss||align=left|Serkan Ozcaglayan|| Pitbull Promotion || Istanbul, Turkey || TKO (Doctor stoppage)  || 1 ||  
|- 
|-  bgcolor="#FFBBBB"
| 2017-05-13 || Loss ||align=left| Donegi Abena || A1 World Combat Cup, Semi Finals || Eindhoven, Netherlands || Decision || 3 || 3:00
|-
|-  bgcolor="#FFBBBB"
| 2014-08-24 || Loss ||align=left| Łukasz Jarosz || Noc Góralskich Wojowników || Poronin, Poland || TKO (low kicks) ||  || 
|-
! style=background:white colspan=9 |
|-  
|-  bgcolor="#CCFFCC"
| 2014-07-12 || Win ||align=left| Christian Brorhilker || Enfusion Live 20 || Majorca, Spain || TKO (low kicks) || 2 || 
|-
|-  bgcolor="#FFBBBB"
| 2014-06-28 || Loss ||align=left| Andrew Tate || Enfusion Live 19 || London, England || TKO (punches) || 2 || 1:07
|-
! style=background:white colspan=9 |
|-
|-  bgcolor="#FFBBBB"
| 2013-09-17 || Loss ||align=left| Daniel Sam || Enfusion 4: Search for the SuperPro, Final 16 || Koh Samui, Thailand || Decision (unanimous) || 3 || 3:00
|-
|-  bgcolor="#FFBBBB"
| 2013-09-12 || Loss ||align=left| Sam Tevette || Enfusion 4: Search for the SuperPro, 1st Round || Koh Samui, Thailand || Decision (unanimous) || 3 || 3:00 
|-
|-  bgcolor="#CCFFCC"
| 2013-07-13 || Win ||align=left| Moises Ruibal || Enfusion Live 7 || Tenerife, Spain || Decision (split) || 5 || 3:00
|-
! style=background:white colspan=9 |
|-  
|-  bgcolor="#FFBBBB"
| 2012-12-02 || Loss ||align=left|Jasmin Bečirović || Enfusion 3: Trial of the Gladiators || Ljubljana, Slovenia || Decision (unanimous) || 3 || 3:00
|-  bgcolor="#FFBBBB"
| 2012-05-27 || Loss ||align=left| Daniel Ghiţă || K-1 World MAX 2012 World Championship Tournament Final 16, Super Fight || Madrid, Spain || TKO (Towel Thrown) || 2 || 1:45
|-  bgcolor="#FFBBBB"
| 2012-03-03 || Loss ||align=left| Frédéric Sinistra || La Nuit Du Kick-Boxing 2012 || Spa, Belgium || Decision (Unanimous) || 3 || 3:00
|-  bgcolor="#FFBBBB"
| 2011-12-30 || Loss ||align=left| Frank Muñoz || Enfusion Kickboxing Tournament '11, Semi Finals || Prague, Czech Republic || Decision (Unanimous) || 3 || 3:00 
|-
|-  bgcolor="#FFBBBB"
| 2011-10-15 || Loss ||align=left| Erhan Deniz || SuperKombat World Grand Prix IV 2011, Final || Piatra Neamț, Romania || Decision (Unanimous) || 3 || 3:00
|-
! style=background:white colspan=9 |
|-
|-  bgcolor="#CCFFCC"
| 2011-10-15 || Win ||align=left| Marian Baryla || SuperKombat World Grand Prix IV 2011, Semifinals || Piatra Neamț, Romania || KO (right low kick) || 3 || 0:51
|-
|-  bgcolor="#FFBBBB"
| 2011-08-17 || Loss||align=left| Franci Grajš || Enfusion 3: Trial of the Gladiators, Quarter Final || Ohrid, Macedonia ||Decision (Unanimous) || 3 || 3:00
|-
|-  bgcolor="CCFFCC"
| 2011-08-12 || Win ||align=left| Jake Bostwick || Enfusion 3: Trial of the Gladiators, First round || Ohrid, Macedonia ||Decision || 3 || 3:00
|- bgcolor="#FFBBBB"
| 2011-05-14 || Loss ||align=left| Yuksel Ayaydin || It's Showtime 2011 Lyon || Lyon, France || Ext.R Decision || 4|| 3:00
|-
|- bgcolor="#FFBBBB"
| 2011-03-19 || Loss  ||align=left| Gokhan Saki || United Glory 13: 2010-2011 World Series  Semi Finals || Charleroi, Belgium || Decision (Unanimous)  || 3 || 3:00
|-
|- bgcolor="#FFBBBB"
| 2011-03-06 || Loss ||align=left| Danyo Ilunga || It's Showtime Sporthallen Zuid || Amsterdam, Netherlands || Decision (Unanimous) || 5 || 3:00 
|-
! style=background:white colspan=9 |
|-
|-  bgcolor="#CCFFCC"
| 2011-02-? || Win ||align=left| Ramazan Ramazanov || Enfusion Kickboxing Tournament '11, 2nd Round || Koh Samui, Thailand || Ext.R Decision || 4 || 3:00 
|-
! style=background:white colspan=9 |
|-
|-  bgcolor="#FFBBBB"
| 2011-01-? || Loss ||align=left| Ondřej Hutník || Enfusion Kickboxing Tournament '11, 1st Round || Koh Samui, Thailand || Decision || 3 || 3:00 
|-
! style=background:white colspan=9 |
|- http://www.ondrahutnik.cz/novinky/
|-  bgcolor="#CCFFCC"
| 2010-12-11 || Win ||align=left| Andonis Tzoros || Yiannis Evgenikos presents: It’s Showtime Athens || Athens, Greece || Decision (4-1) || 3 || 3:00 
|-
|-  bgcolor="#FFBBBB"
| 2010-10-29 || Loss ||align=left| Dževad Poturak || K-1 ColliZion/Local Kombat 2009 Sarajevo || Sarajevo, Bosnia and Herzegovina || Decision || 3 || 3:00
|-  bgcolor="#CCFFCC"
| 2010-10-16 || Win ||align=left| Stefan Leko ||United Glory 12: 2010-2011 World Series Quarter Finals || Amsterdam, Netherlands || TKO (Retirement) || 2 || 1:44
|-
! style=background:white colspan=9 |
|-
|-  bgcolor="#FFBBBB"
| 2010-04-17 || Loss ||align=left| Bjorn Bregy || It's Showtime 2010 Budapest || Budapest, Hungary || Decision || 3 || 3:00
|-  bgcolor="#FFBBBB"
| 2010-03-13 || Loss ||align=left| Luca Panto || Oktagon presents: It's Showtime 2010 || Milan, Italy || Decision || 3 || 3:00
|-  bgcolor="#FFBBBB"
| 2009-10-17 || Loss ||align=left| Errol Zimmerman || Ultimate Glory 11: A Decade of Fights || Amsterdam, Netherlands || Ext R. Decision || 4 || 3:00
|-  bgcolor="#CCFFCC"
| 2009-08-29 || Win ||align=left| Rustemi Kreshnik || It's Showtime 2009 Budapest || Budapest, Hungary || Decision || 3 || 3:00
|-  bgcolor="#FFBBBB"
| 2009-06-25 || Loss ||align=left| Tomáš Hron || Gladiators Games || Prague, Czech Republic || Decision || 3 || 3:00
|-
|-  bgcolor="#CCFFCC"
| 2009-03-14 || Win ||align=left| Jasmin Becirovic || Oktagon presents: It's Showtime 2009 || Milan, Italy || Decision (Unanimous) || 3 || 3:00
|-  bgcolor="#CCFFCC"
| 2008-02-17 || Win ||align=left| Rick van Soest || K-1 MAX Netherlands 2008 The Final Qualification || Utrecht, Netherlands || Decision (unanimous) || 3 || 3:00
|-  bgcolor="#CCFFCC"
| 2007-10-21 || Win ||align=left| Ginty Vrede || Gala Top Team || Beverwijk, Netherlands || Decision || 5 || 3:00
|-  bgcolor="#FFBBBB"
| 2007-09-23 || Loss ||align=left| Hesdy Gerges || Rings Holland: Risky Business || Utrecht, Netherlands || Decision || 3 || 3:00
|-  bgcolor="#CCFFCC"
| 2007-04-07 || Win ||align=left| Roger Pinas || The Art of Muaythai  || Apeldoorn, Netherlands || Decision || 5 || 3:00
|-
|-
| colspan=9 | Legend:

See also
List of male kickboxers
List of K-1 Events

References

1971 births
Living people
Curaçao male kickboxers
Dutch male kickboxers
Cruiserweight kickboxers
Heavyweight kickboxers
Curaçao Muay Thai practitioners
Dutch Muay Thai practitioners
Dutch people of Curaçao descent
SUPERKOMBAT kickboxers